Aristoxenus (Gr. ) was a Greek physician of Asia Minor who was quoted by Caelius Aurelianus.   He was a pupil of Alexander Philalethes and contemporary of Demosthenes Philalethes, and must therefore have lived around the 1st century BC.  He was a follower of the teachings of Herophilos, and studied at the celebrated Herophilean school at the village of Men-Carus, between Laodicea and Carura.  He wrote a work  (On the Herophilean Sect, Latin: De Herophili Secta), of which the thirteenth book is quoted by Galen, but which is no longer extant.

References

1st-century BC Greek physicians
1st-century BC writers
Ancient Greek writers known only from secondary sources
People from Roman Anatolia